Padanayarkulangara Mahadeva Temple is an ancient Hindu temple dedicated to Lord Shiva is situated on the banks of the Pallikkal River at Karunagappally town of Kollam District in Kerala state in India. The temple is a part of the 108 famous Shiva temples in Kerala.

Myth
There are many legends to tell about Karunagappally Padaanayarkulangara Mahadeva Temple. Prominent among these are; It believe that Shiva and Krishna were going through this passageway. They were tired of walking and reached this Karunagappally which was formerly forested. Lord Krishna was sent to find the best place to stay. Lord Krishna invented the place but established himself there by the beauty of the place. It was only when Mahadevan was waiting for a long time that he was sent to find the place and come back. After searching a long time, Lord Shiva found that Krishna was sitting a beautiful place and he also like to sit next to him.

History
Karunagappally was a part of the Ay dynasty and later became part of Odanad and then Travancore.
 The headquarters of the Kayamkulam kings was in Karunagappally for some time. The Pattanayarkulangara Temple, which was a Buddhist temple at that time, was converted into a Hindu temple. Many places in Kerala, formerly known as Palli, were former Buddhist shrines or their monasteries. A Buddha statue, dated to the 9th century, was recovered from Marathurkulangara in Taluk.

How to Reach
The temple is located on the National Highway-47 in Karunagappally town, facing the Sasthamcotta road.

References

108 Shiva Temples
Shiva temples in Kerala
Hindu temples in Kollam district